EEFL may refer to: 

 Eastern Eyre Football League, an Australian rules football competition based in the Eyre Peninsula region of South Australia
 External Electrode Fluorescent Lamp, a plasma lamp coated with phosphor, which has no electrodes inside the lamp
 Eighth Edition For Life, a movement by players of Warhammer Fantasy to continue playing the eighth edition rules set